Big Tom was an Irish singer and musician.

Big Tom may also refer to:

Geography
 Big Tom (New York), a mountain in the Catskill Mountains of New York
 Big Tom, a summit in the Black Mountains (North Carolina), named after hunter and guide Thomas "Big Tom" Wilson (1825–1909)
 Big Tom, Bronx, a submerged rock in Eastchester Bay, the Bronx, New York
 Big Tom Lake, Two Inlets Township, Becker County, Minnesota
 Eastside Big Tom's, a hamburger restaurant in Olympia, Washington

Nickname
 Tom Brown (police chief) (1889–1959), corrupt police chief of St. Paul, Minnesota, in the 1930s
 Thomas F. Foley (1852–1925), American politician and saloon owner in New York City (see List of identities in The Gangs of New York (book)#Politicians)
 Tom Moody (born 1965), Australian cricket coach and former first-class cricketer
 Tom O'Reilly (Cavan politician) (1915–1995), Irish Gaelic footballer, politician and farmer
 Tom Phillips (baseball) (1889–1929), American Major League Baseball pitcher
 Thomas Rienzi (1919–2010), United States Army major general
 Fyodor Sergeyev (1883–1921), Russian revolutionary, Soviet politician, agitator and journalist

Arts and entertainment
 Big Tom, a character in the TV series The Good Guys (1968–1970), played by Alan Hale Jr.
 "Big Tom", a 1959 episode of the radio series Gunsmoke
 "Big Tom", a 1960 episode of the TV series Gunsmoke
 Big Tom, a one-act religious play by Ernest Ferlita

Horses
 Big Tom, disqualified winner of the 1968 Apple Blossom Handicap Thoroughbred horse race
 Big Tom, a horse that set the track record for Balmoral Park, Illinois in 2000

Other uses
 "Big Tom: the World's Largest Turkey", a statue in Frazee, Minnesota
 Big Tom, a variety of pumpkin - see List of pumpkin varieties grown in the United States

Lists of people by nickname